Giovanni Maria Bottala (1613–1644) was an Italian painter active in the Baroque period.

He was born in Savona. He traveled to Rome as a young boy, and later became pupil of Pietro da Cortona in Rome. He painted in Rome, Naples, and Genoa. He was taken into the patronage of Cardinal Giulio Sacchetti, for whom he painted a Meeting of Jacob and Esau. Bottala acquired the name of 'Rafaellino,' from his great veneration for the works of Raphael. Other works are in the churches of Naples and Genoa. He died at Milan.

References

 Camillo Manzitti, "Considerazioni e novità su Raffaellino Bottalla", in "Paragone, n. 49, Maggio 2003.

1613 births
1644 deaths
People from Savona
17th-century Italian painters
Italian male painters
Painters from Genoa
Italian Baroque painters